This is a list of defunct airlines of Suriname.

See also
 List of airlines of Suriname
 List of airports in Suriname

References

Suriname
Airlines
Airlines, defunct